SAF Tehnika (from Latvian Super Augstas Frekvences – "Super High Frequencies") is a Latvian designer, producer and distributor of digital Microwave Data transmission equipment. SAF Tehnika products provide wireless backhaul solutions for digital voice and data transmission to mobile and fixed network operators, data service providers, governments, and private companies. The company sells microwave point-to-point radios for licensed and license-free frequency bands, as well as unique spectrum analyzer Spectrum Compact. SAF Tehnika also provides customized microwave solutions for various applications, such as Broadcasting and Low latency networks.

In 2004 SAF Tehnika acquired a Swedish company, – SAF Tehnika Sweden, a fully owned subsidiary, based in Gothenburg. In 2008, however, it was bought out by its management, which rebranded it as "Trebax AB". In May 2004 the company launched a successful IPO with initial market capitalization of more than €50 million, with substantial subscriptions from institutional investors. The company is listed on the NASDAQ OMX Riga under the symbol SAF1R.

During the 2000s, SAF Tehnika has taken next steps towards global expansion by developing a large network of authorized partners and sales representatives all over the globe, most notable being the opening of SAF Tehnika North America office and warehouse facilities in Denver in 2013.

Key Company Milestones 
1999 SAF Tehnika company establishment
2000 Introduction of PDH (CFM) product line
2003 ISO 9001 certification, Member of ETSI
2004 Acquisition of the Swedish company "Viking Microwave" developing SDH radio systems.
2004 Public company, listed on Riga Stock Exchange (now NASDAQ OMX Riga) after a successful IPO
2006 SDH (CFQ) product line launch in the market
2006 Sales growth up to 62 markets.
2006 Implementation of a new automated modern manufacturing line. Release of CFQ-RG-IDU – the latest addition to SAF CFQ product line
2008 Launch of 100Mbit/s radio – SAF CFIP product line
2008 Buyout of SAF tehnika Sweden, which changes the name to "Trebax AB"
2009 Launch of 2 new 366Mbit/s systems – CFIP Lumina and CFIP Phoenix
2010 Sales growth up to 99 markets
2011 Launch of 2 new products – CFIP Marathon 1.4 GHz and CFIP Phoenix Modular
2012 Release of the CFIP Low Latency Active Repeater – highly competitive 6 GHz+ 35ns radio unit for use in low latency networks
2013 Opening of the US headquarters and warehouse in Denver, CO
2013 Launch of the next generation microwave radio platform Integra
2013 Company's global presence reached more than 130 countries worldwide
2013 Release of the world's smallest spectrum analyzer Spectrum Compact
2014 Launch of Integra S
2014 Launch of CFIP PhoeniX IRFU
2014 Launch of Integra-W and Integra-WS
2014 Launch of SG Compact
2015 Launch of Line of Sight Verification Kit
2015 Development of Ultra-Low Latency solutions with the key product being –CFIP Low Latency Repeater
2015 Development of Outdoor Branching Unit (OBU)
2015 Launch of Integra G, Integra GS
2016 Release of Spectrum Compact E-band
2017 Launch of environmental IoT monitor  Aranet
2017 Release of Spectrum Compact V-band

Supporter of the University of Latvia Foundation 
SAF Tehnika is a supporter of the University of Latvia Foundation. In 2011, he supported the magazine "Terra" in the amount of 430 euros and the "Excellence Award 2011" in the amount of 1,450 euros. In 2015, a project was set up to support the participation of talented students in the World Physics Olympiad in Mumbai, India, in the amount of EUR 2,500. In 2016, the University of Latvia Business Ideas Fund is supported in the amount of 1,000 EUR.

See also 

Corporate website

References 

Telecommunications companies established in 1999
Telecommunications equipment
Telecommunications equipment vendors
Manufacturing companies based in Riga
Electronics companies of Latvia
Latvian brands
Companies listed on Nasdaq Riga
Latvian companies established in 1999